NGC 1316 (also known as Fornax A) is a lenticular galaxy about 60 million light-years away in the constellation Fornax. It is a radio galaxy and at 1400 MHz is the fourth-brightest radio source in the sky.

Structure and formation
In the late 1970s, François Schweizer studied NGC 1316 extensively and found that the galaxy appeared to look like a small elliptical galaxy with some unusual dust lanes embedded within a much larger envelope of stars.  The outer envelope contained many ripples, loops, and arcs.  He also identified the presence of a compact disk of gas near the center that appeared inclined relative to the stars and that appeared to rotate faster than the stars (the mass-to-light ratio run in the center of NGC 1316 resembles that of many other giant ellipticals). Based on these results, Schweizer considered that NGC 1316 was built up through the merger of several smaller galaxies. Such merger events may have fueled the central supermassive black hole, that has a mass estimated in 130–150 million of solar masses with gas, causing the galaxy to become a radio galaxy.  He also states that NGC 1316 is comparable to the giant elliptical galaxies found in the centers of other clusters of galaxies. Using spectroscopy of its brightest globular clusters, the merger is estimated to have occurred ~3 billion years ago. 
NGC 1316 spans about 50 000 light-years.

It has been proposed too that NGC 1316 may be a galaxy in evolution that eventually will become a Sombrero-like system dominated by a large bulge.

Companions and environment

NGC 1316 is located within the Fornax Cluster, a cluster of galaxies in the constellation Fornax.  However, in contrast to Messier 87, which is a similar elliptical galaxy that is located in the center of the Virgo Cluster, NGC 1316 is located at the edge of the Fornax Cluster.

NGC 1316 appears to be interacting with NGC 1317, a small spiral galaxy to the north.  However, that small spiral galaxy does not appear to be sufficiently large enough to cause the distortions seen in the structure of this galaxy.

NGC 1316 has hosted four supernovae (all type Ia): 1980N, 1981D, 2006dd and 2006mr.

Distance estimates

At least two methods have been used to estimate the distance to NGC 1316: surface brightness fluctuation (SBF) in 2003 and planetary nebula luminosity function (PNLF) in 2006.  Being a lenticular galaxy, it is not suitable to apply the cepheid variable method.  Using SBF, a distance estimate of 20.0 ± 1.6 Mpc was computed.  Using PNLF, 45 planetary nebula candidates were located and a distance estimate of 17.9  Mpc was computed.  Averaged together, these two distance measurements give a combined distance estimate of 62.0 ± 2.9 Mly (19.0 ± 0.9 Mpc).

See also
 Centaurus A 
 Messier 87
 NGC 1097

Notes

average(20.0 ± 1.6, 17.9 ) = ((20.0 + 17.9) / 2) ± ((1.62 + 0.82)0.5 / 2) = 19.0 ± 0.9

Citations

External links

 
 
 NGC 1316 at ESA/Hubble

Lenticular galaxies
Shell galaxies
Fornax Cluster
Fornax (constellation)
1316
12651
154